Chima jeogori is a Korean term for a women's outfit consisting of a chima skirt and jeogori top. Men wear baji jeogori: baji (baggy pants) and jeogori. It is not a national costume per se, but a form of hanbok, the traditional Korean form of dress.

History
At the end of the 19th century, the tongchima (통치마), seamless one-piece short skirt, came out for convenience. School girls used to wear a white jeogori and a black tongchima in modern educational institutions. This fashion gradually faded out in South Korea while revived and continues in North Korea.

In Japan, some ethnic Korean minority schools use a girls' uniform that is based on tongchima. This form of chima jeogori is modified into white shirt and shorter ankle length black or blue dress.  For the safety of the children, from April, 1999 most of these schools use the chima jeogori inside the school and allow students to wear another non-chima jeogori uniform (the second uniform 第2制服) to go to school and go home.

See also

Culture of Korea
 and/or – Chinese equivalent

References

lifeinkorea.com
The Summary Report of the NGOs in Japan

Further reading

Korean culture
Korean clothing
Dresses